The 2013 World Series of Poker was the 44th annual World Series of Poker (WSOP). It was held at the Rio All Suite Hotel and Casino in Paradise, Nevada between May 29 – July 15, 2013. There was 62 bracelet events, culminating in the $10,000 No Limit Hold'em Main Event beginning on July 6. The November Nine concept returned for a sixth year, with the Main Event finalists returning on November 4.

The One Drop Foundation, a charity founded by Cirque du Soleil founder Guy Laliberté devoted to providing safe water supplies in developing countries, continued a relationship with the WSOP that began with the 2012 edition. While last year's $1 million Big One for One Drop was not held this year, the WSOP held two events that raised money for the charity. The first event was the One Drop High Roller, with a buy-in of $111,111; the Rio donated its 3% rake of the entry fees to One Drop. The other was the "Little One for One Drop", with a $1,111 buy-in plus unlimited rebuys, with One Drop receiving $111 from each buy-in and rebuy.

In April 2013, the WSOP expanded and held bracelet events in Australia at the 2013 World Series of Poker Asia-Pacific.

Event schedule

Main Event
The $10,000 No Limit Hold'em Main Event began on July 6 with the first of three starting days. Remaining players from days 1A and 1B returned on Day 2AB, while the players from Day 1C returned on Day 2C with the entire field combining on Day 3. The final table of nine players was reached on July 15, with the November Nine returning on November 4.

The Main Event attracted 6,352 entrants, creating a prize pool of $59,708,800. The top 648 finishers placed in the money, with the top nine players receiving at least $733,224. The winner of the Main Event earned $8,359,531.

Performance of past champions

 * Indicates the place of a player who finished in the money

Other notable high finishes
NB: This list is restricted to top 30 finishers with an existing Wikipedia entry.

November Nine
*Career statistics prior to the beginning of the 2013 Main Event.

Final Table

References

External links
Official site
Original source of live updates from WSOP 2013

World Series of Poker
World Series of Poker